Mound of Immortality is the name of several memorials/monuments in the former Soviet Union that commemorate the Soviet soldiers and ordinary citizens who fought and perished during the German–Soviet War. They exist in the following locations:

Polotsk, Belarus 
Orsha, Belarus 
Bryansk, Russia
Smolensk, Russia 
Yefremov, Tula Oblast, Russia 

In addition there is a Mound of Immortality in honor of Polish-Lithuanian-Belarusian poet Adam Mickiewicz in Novogrudok, Belarus.

See also
 Mound of Glory

References

Commemorative mounds
Soviet military memorials and cemeteries